Finnsnes Idrettslag is a sports club from Finnsnes, Norway. It is most known for its association football department, which has played in the Norwegian Second Division, the third tier of Norwegian football. It currently plays in the Norwegian Fourth Division.

Recent history 
{|class="wikitable"
|-bgcolor="#efefef"
! Season
!
! Pos.
! Pl.
! W
! D
! L
! GS
! GA
! P
!Cup
!Notes
|-
|2011
|3. divisjon
|align=right bgcolor=#DDFFDD|1
|align=right|22||align=right|18||align=right|1||align=right|3
|align=right|86||align=right|21||align=right|55
|First round
|Promoted
|-
|2012
|2. divisjon
|align=right bgcolor="#FFCCCC"| 13
|align=right|26||align=right|8||align=right|3||align=right|15
|align=right|35||align=right|51||align=right|27
||First round
|Relegated
|-
|2013
|3. divisjon
|align=right bgcolor=#DDFFDD|1
|align=right|22||align=right|21||align=right|1||align=right|0
|align=right|92||align=right|11||align=right|64
|Second qualifying round
|Promoted
|-
|2014
|2. divisjon
|align=right |6
|align=right|26||align=right|14||align=right|1||align=right|11
|align=right|45||align=right|41||align=right|43
||Second round
|
|-
|2015
|2. divisjon
|align=right |4
|align=right|26||align=right|15||align=right|4||align=right|7
|align=right|53||align=right|45||align=right|49
|Second round
|
|-
|2016 
|2. divisjon
|align=right |2
|align=right|26||align=right|16||align=right|8||align=right|2
|align=right|52||align=right|22||align=right|56
|Second round
|
|-
|2017 
|2. divisjon
|align=right bgcolor="#FFCCCC"| 12
|align=right|26||align=right|6||align=right|4||align=right|16
|align=right|26||align=right|45||align=right|22
|Second round
|Relegated
|-
|2018
|3. divisjon
|align=right |8
|align=right|26||align=right|8||align=right|10||align=right|8
|align=right|41||align=right|34||align=right|34
|First round
|
|-
|2019
|3. divisjon
|align=right |2
|align=right|26||align=right|16||align=right|6||align=right|4
|align=right|67||align=right|29||align=right|54
|Second qualifying round
|
|-
|2020
|colspan="11"|Season cancelled
|-
|2021
|3. divisjon
|align=right bgcolor="#FFCCCC"| 14
|align=right|13||align=right|2||align=right|0||align=right|11
|align=right|17||align=right|36||align=right|6
|First round
|Relegated
|}

References

External links 
Official site 

Football clubs in Norway
Association football clubs established in 1922
1922 establishments in Norway
Defunct athletics clubs in Norway
Sport in Troms
Lenvik
Ski jumping clubs in Norway